Sir Ronald Henry Melville, KCB (9 March 1912 – 4 June 2001) was an English civil servant. Educated at Magdalene College, Cambridge, he entered the civil service in 1934 as an official in the Air Ministry. For much of the Second World War, he was private secretary to the Secretary of State for Air. In 1960, he moved to the War Office and in 1964 he was appointed Second Permanent Secretary of the Ministry of Defence. He then served as Permanent Secretary of the Ministry of Aviation from 1966 to 1967, when it was merged into the Ministry of Technology; Melville was then Secretary with responsibility for aviation matters. In 1970, he was appointed Permanent Secretary of the Ministry of Aviation Supply, serving until it was abolished in 1971. An excellent shot, from 1972 to 1984 he was chairman of the National Rifle Association; at the same time, he was a council member of the Army Cadet Force Association. His translation of Lucretius's De Rerum Natura was published in 1997.

References 

1912 births
2001 deaths
English civil servants
Alumni of Magdalene College, Cambridge
Knights Companion of the Order of the Bath
People of the National Rifle Association